"The Penguin Declines" is the 73rd episode of Batman, the conclusion of a three-part story in its second season on ABC. Its original telecast occurred on January 18, 1967, with a rerun on June 21. It guest-starred Cesar Romero as Joker and Burgess Meredith as Penguin.

Plot synopsis
In the previous episode, Batman and Joker's former henchwoman Venus are chained in a water pit where a giant clam has (almost) already swallowed Robin. Using every ounce of his strength, Batman bursts free of his chains, rushes over to the clam and pries it open long enough to rescue Robin from the maw of the mollusk. Freeing Venus, the trio make their escape, while the Joker, needing more assistance with his remaining two Zodiac crimes, has his henchmen Uranus and Mars smuggle the Penguin out of prison in a prison laundry truck by way of "Operation: Laundry Bag". Serious dissension soon builds between the two.

Using a mixture of his own insidious creation, "Jokerjelly" (concentrated strawberry gelatin which resembles strawberry jelly, but tastes like strawberry axle grease), Joker and crew go to the Gotham City Reservoir, where he infuses the entire Gotham City water supply (Aquarius), and then demands $10 million to ransom it back. Meanwhile, the Penguin, claiming he has reformed, tries to win over Venus (who's staying at Bruce Wayne's midtown apartment) into asking Batman to let her visit the Batcave, so she can remove Penguin's criminal record from the Batcomputer for him.

Batman and Robin fly out to the Jokerjelly-infested Gotham City Reservoir by Batcopter and restore the water supply with the trusty aid of a "Special Exploding Batarang" and the "Portable Batlab". Returning to the city, Batman and Robin pay a visit to Venus, who, falling for Penguin's fib about going straight, she convinces Batman into taking her to the Batcave. What the Dynamic Duo doesn't realize: Joker and Penguin are hoping to make Batman the goat (Capricorn).

Batman and Robin return to the Batcave with Venus (having doused her with Batgas, naturally), and after a small tour, they get a surprise when the Penguin, Joker, Mercury, Mars, Saturn, Neptune and Uranus pop right out of the Batmobile's trunk, ready to assassinate them, and convert the Batcave into the headquarters of Gotham City's criminals. But Batman stops them by activating his newly designed "Batspectrograph Criminal Analyzer", which recorded Joker and Penguin's bone structure, metabolism rate, molecular blood structure, retina patterns, and other invaluable scientific data (he knew they were hiding in the trunk all along, and so he brought them both to the Batcave in order to utilize the analyzer which only works at close range and is too large to move). Penguin tries to kill Batman and Robin with his umbrella gun, but the "Batprobe Negative Ion Attractor", which Batman strategically installed in the Batmobile's trunk, depleted its power source during the time they were inside. After a fierce fight, the whole gang is captured and ready to be delivered to prison. Furthermore, when the Joker and Penguin threaten to reveal the location of the Batcave, which obviously would betray the Batman and Robin's secret identities, Batman reminds them to their profound chagrin that they've seen only the cave's interior and not its exterior so they have no idea of its location. While the Joker and Penguin accuse each other for forgetting to look out of the trunk during the trip, Batman reveals to Robin and Venus that he locked the trunk hatch while they were inside so they never would have been able to open it in transit anyway. He then calms down the Penguin and Joker by putting them under with a whiff of Batgas.

Later at Wayne Manor, Dick Grayson cringes as he learns from Alfred that the main course for dinner is clam chowder, but Bruce Wayne assures him it's his chance to get even.

TOMORROW
The Cat-astrophic return of Julie Newmar as The Catwoman!

Notes
 Rob Reiner (Delivery Boy) later gained fame as Michael "Meathead" Stivic on All in the Family (CBS, 1971–79).
 Robin notes that he and Batman (with Alfred's help) were able to foil Joker's previous plan to heist Gotham City's water supply. This is an allusion to the episode, "The Joker's Provokers", earlier in Season 2, when Joker placed a hallucinogen in the water supply during his time-altering scheme.
 First episode appearance of The Batcopter, which debuted in the 1966 movie.

External links
 

Batman (TV series) episodes
1967 American television episodes
Television episodes written by Stephen Kandel